Basil William Hoskins (10 June 1929 – 17 January 2005) was an English theatre and film actor.

Hoskins, a native of Edmonton, London, was educated at the Edmonton County School. Hoskins studied acting at RADA and joined the Nottingham Playhouse Company in 1951. Hoskins was the long-term partner of fellow English actor Harry Andrews. They are buried alongside each other at St Mary the Virgin, Salehurst, in East Sussex.

His best-known films are Ice Cold in Alex (1958) and North West Frontier (1959). On television, he played the part of Number 14 on The Prisoner television series (episode "Hammer Into Anvil").

Filmography
 It Started in Paradise (1952) – 2nd Detective (uncredited)
 Ice Cold in Alex (1958) – C.M.P. Lieutenant (Alexandria)
 North West Frontier (1959) – A.D.C.
 The Millionairess (1960) – First Secretary
 Edge of Sanity (1989) – Mr. Bottingham

Notes

External links
 
 The Prisoner
 Information at Edmonton County School

1929 births
2005 deaths
Alumni of RADA
English male film actors
English male stage actors
English male television actors
English gay actors
People from Edmonton, London
Place of death missing
People from Salehurst
20th-century English LGBT people
21st-century English LGBT people